Raw Money Raps is the debut studio album by American hip hop musician Jeremiah Jae. It was released through Brainfeeder on July 24, 2012.

Critical reception

At Metacritic, which assigns a weighted average score out of 100 to reviews from mainstream critics, the album received an average score of 79, based on 8 reviews, indicating "generally favorable reviews".

Marcus J. Moore of Beats Per Minute commented that "The album dissolves as it progresses, transitioning from upbeat fare to a visceral dream sequence of disoriented meditation set atop a versatile soundtrack." Eric Thorp of Clash described the album as "an exciting audible adventure into progressive hip-hop." Bram E. Gieben of The Skinny wrote, "A slow burner, Raw Money Raps is soulful, difficult, heartfelt and utterly modern."

Rhapsody placed it at number 12 on the "Top 20 Hip-Hop Albums of 2012" list. Potholes in My Blog placed it at number 32 on the "50 Best Albums of 2012” list.

Track listing

Personnel
Credits adapted from liner notes.

 Jeremiah Jae – vocals, production (1–6, 8–19)
 Tre – vocals (3)
 K Embry – vocals (6)
 Flying Lotus – production (7)
 B+ – photography

References

External links
 

2012 debut albums
Brainfeeder albums
Jeremiah Jae albums
Albums produced by Flying Lotus